Australian abseiling (also known as Australian rappelling, Rap Jumping, Angel Jumping or deepelling) is the process of descending a fixed rope (abseiling) in a standing position while facing the ground.

The technique is used as a military "assault" technique whereby a soldier is belayed, allowing them to face down the descent and fire a weapon.

In Australia, the technique is not commonly known as "Australian", or even "rappelling"; instead the term "abseiling" is more commonly used and the technique is referred to as "Geneva" style.

History 

Rap Jumping comes from Macka's style and a form of rope work started by the Australian Army in the late 1960s which was known as the "Carabiner Rundown" and internationally known as the Aussie Rappel because of its origin. Macka MacKail created the name "Rap Jumping" to describe his style of forward free-fall jumping and based it in Cairns, Australia as early as 1988. Founder, Macka MacKail gained Certification while serving with the Australian Special Air Service Regiment (SASR).

Commercial operation of Rap Jumping started in 1989 with the issue of permits from the Mulgrave Shire Council in the Barron Gorge Cairns on the site known as the Hinge (Split Rock), and Macka's Bluff which has six different jump faces.
 
This led to jumping from high rise buildings. The first of the buildings jumped was the Pacific Hotel, Cairns in 1989, and subsequently the first fully commercial operation at the Gold Coast International Hotel, Surfers Paradise. Rap Jumping is still operating in Melbourne, Australia

Notes

References 
 The Original Pioneer of Rap Jumping Australia 
 Outdoor Council of Australia, National Outdoor Leader Registration Scheme, Abseiling - Natural Surfaces 
 "abseiling". Merriam-Webster Online Dictionary. 2010. Merriam-Webster Online. 30 May 2010.

External links
 The Original Rap Jumping Facebook Page
 The Original Pioneer of Rap Jumping Australia 

Climbing techniques